FK Bor Stadium, commonly known as Stadion kraj Pirita, is a multi-purpose stadium in Bor, Serbia. The current capacity of the stadium is 5,000. FK Bor stadium was built in 1956. First match was played in April 1957. between local rivals FK Bor and Metalac. In that period stadium was one of the most modern stadiums in former Yugoslavia.

In 2014. FK Bor in a cooperation with Football Association of Serbia announce plans to build new stadium on the same place with capacity of 5000, where Serbia national football team will also play their home matches. However, this plan never materialized.

Today, Public institution "Sports Center Bor" and the City of Bor are taking care of this stadium from 2019. This decision is made after four months of talks with  FK Bor management and parents of kids from football academy. It is still impossible to complete reconstruction of whole stadium, due to property rights issue.

See also
 List of football stadiums in Serbia
 FK Bor

References 

Sports venues in Bor, Serbia
Bor, Serbia
Football venues in Serbia
Multi-purpose stadiums in Serbia